Herman Legger (7 July 1895 – 7 September 1978) was a Dutch footballer. He played in two matches for the Netherlands national football team in 1921 and 1922.

References

1895 births
1978 deaths
Dutch footballers
Netherlands international footballers
People from Veendam
Association football midfielders
Be Quick 1887 players
Footballers from Groningen (province)